In Case We Die is the debut mixtape by American recording artist Tinashe, first released on February 1, 2012 via her official website. The mixtape was released following a four-year stint as lead singer of girl group The Stunners and her array of non-album singles, including a collaboration with producers OFM, "Artificial People", in 2011.

As executive producer, Tinashe enlisted a variety of musical producers including  B. Hendrixx, Wes Tarte, K-BeatZ, Yung Shaq aka now PianoBoy, J. Mixx, Myles Morgan, Bobby Brackins and producing partner Nic Nac were involved as well. Musically the project develops a new sound for Tinashe, leaving behind her previous dance-pop sounds heard in the band for a contemporary PBR&B, alternative dance, R&B, hip hop sound.

The album was preceded by the release of the buzz single, "Chainless", and later, official single "My High" was released for streaming on her official website. The second official single released from In Case We Die was announced as "This Feeling". The music video was released on May 1, 2012 to GlobalGrind.com. The mixtape's final single, "Boss", was released August 20, 2012 just after the song was featured in an episode of the VH1 series Single Ladies.

In Case We Die received positive reviews from music critics, who complimented the mixtape's subgenres and its "chilled vibe", with some critics calling it "brilliant" and praising the "production and introspective lyricism." Other critics compared the mixtape to those of Kanye West, The Weeknd, Cassie, and Rihanna.

Background
In 2007, after being approached by pop-singer/songwriter Colleen "Vitamin C" Fitzpatrick, Tinashe joined the all-girl pop group The Stunners as the lead singer. After a four-year run, including opening for Justin Bieber on his My World Tour, the group disbanded in 2011. After being signed to Columbia/Sony and Universal Republic with The Stunners, Tinashe began to independently release several solo singles such as covers of Lil Wayne's hit single "How to Love" and Rihanna's "We Found Love", and the dance/club song "Artificial People" (a collaboration with production duo OFM).
On December 20, 2011, Tinashe announced that she would be releasing a mixtape entitled In Case We Die in 2012.

Promotion
A promo single from the mixtape entitled "Chainless" was released to iTunes the next day. Tinashe clarified on Twitter that "Chainless" was a "fun, character [song], dedicated to the west", rather than an official single from the mixtape, on which it was later called a 'bonus track'. The music video was released at midnight on December 21. It was directed by Bobby Brackins and Nic Nac, being the first video that Tinashe had not directed herself.
On January 30, 2012, Tinashe revealed that the first official single from the mixtape would be "My High" and was released for streaming on her official website. A video was shot in early 2012, but never released. Tinashe re-shot the video the first week of June. The second single was later announced as "This Feeling" with a music video directed by Cole Walliser shot in March. The music video was released on May 1, 2012 to GlobalGrind.com. In an interview with Rosewood Radio on May 15, Tinashe confirmed that the video for "This Feeling" would be sent to BET's 106 and Park for play. She also confirmed the next single from the mixtape as "Boss".

Critical reception
Reviews for the conceptual mixtape were generally positive. On the popular mixtape site DatPiff it was the number 1 most downloaded mixtape on its release date. An ad showing this was displayed across the homepage of popular hip-hop website World Star Hip Hop. MuuMuse.com called the mixtape "brilliant" and said that it was "by far her most impressive moment yet – an incredible display of stone-cold serious artistry, featuring daring production and introspective lyricism that deserves to have the blogosphere going positively abuzz." In the same review she was compared to the likes of hip-hop heavyweight Kanye West, The Weeknd, Cassie, and pop star Rihanna. GRAE New York called the mixtape "dreamy, seductive, and edgy", also comparing her to The Weeknd as well as Lana Del Rey. LozzaMusic.com noted that "it touches upon a lot of pop's subgenres, with quite a chilled vibe being present throughout." MTV Buzzworthy highlighted "Let You Love Me" and wrote that In Case We Die "demonstrates a vastly more mature ear than her age would suggest: Full of drippy beats, atmospheric noise and sexy croons echoing off in the distance, the mixtape recalls the moodiness of The Weeknd or Kanye West's My Beautiful Dark Twisted Fantasy – an incredibly impressive sound to achieve [...] One of the year's first truly exciting and creative releases".

Track listing

All credits adapted from the included digital booklet.

Release history

Legacy 
The legacy of In Case We Die has endured since its release. "The Last Night on Earth" was sampled by Marcus Orelias on the song "Book VII" for the album Rebel of the Underground, and "Let Me Love You" was later remixed by XXYYXX.

References

External links
Tinashe's Official Website

2012 mixtape albums
Tinashe albums
Debut mixtape albums